Buscando el paraíso (Looking for paradise) is a Mexican telenovela produced by Luis de Llano Macedo and Marco Flavio Cruz for Televisa in 1993.

Pedro Fernández and Yolanda Andrade starred as protagonists, while Karla Álvarez starred as main antagonist.

Plot 
Dalia and Andrea are two very different girls despite being sisters. Andrea has always been sexy heartbreaker instead his sister is shy and insecure. Dalia has a secret, is in love with Ángel a professional conqueror and former boyfriend of Andrea.

To make him jealous Andrea, Ángel begins a relationship with Dalia, but then leaves to seduce her. Actually he is obsessed with sensual Lolita, who is the father of Ángel lover. Abandoned and pregnant, Dalia refuge in the affection Julio a poor boy, but worker. Only Andrea jealousy and the return of Ángel's spread.

Cast 
 
Pedro Fernández as Julio Flores Vallado
Yolanda Andrade as Dalia Montero Machado
Karla Álvarez as Andrea Montero Machado
Alejandro Ibarra as Ángel
Tiaré Scanda as Alma
Lorena Rojas as Lolita
Fernando Balzaretti as Don Luis
Alonso Echánove as Horacio
María Rojo as Amalia
Amparo Arozamena as Doña Edna
Anna Silvetti as Carmelita
Carlos Espejel as Benjamín
Blanca Sánchez as Gabriela
Patricio Castillo as Don Patricio
Otto Sirgo as Don Ángel
José Suárez as Eduardo
Alejandro Treviño as Erik
Tina Romero as Elsa
Sergio Bustamante as Marcelo
Mauricio Armando as Diego
Alejandra Morales as Martha
Salvador Sánchez as Detective Berriozábal
Geraldine Bazán as Alma (young)
Mónika Sánchez
Marta Aura
Anna Ciocchetti

Awards

References

External links

1993 telenovelas
Mexican telenovelas
1993 Mexican television series debuts
1994 Mexican television series endings
Spanish-language telenovelas
Television shows set in Mexico City
Televisa telenovelas